Marcus Öberg (born February 18, 1982) is a Swedish middleweight Muay Thai kickboxer fighting out of Malmö Muay Thai Gym in Malmö. He is former two time Swedish champion and K-1 Scandinavia MAX 2008 tournament winner.

Titles
 2010 SportAccord Combat Games Silver medal -71 kg
 2008 K-1 Scandinavia MAX champion
 2008 Busan TAFISA World Games IFMA Amateur Muay Thai 71 kg bronze medal
 2008 Swedish IFMA Muay Thai champion 71 kg
 2006 Swedish IFMA Muay Thai champion 75 kg
 2006 Champions Fight Night 4- man tournament champion

Fight record

|-  bgcolor="#CCFFCC"
| 2011-03-12 || Win  ||align=left| Khalid Bourdif || Fight Code: Dragon Series Round 2 || Milan, Italy || Decision || 3 || 3:00
|-  bgcolor="#FFBBBB"
| 2010-11-27 || Loss ||align=left| Artur Kyshenko || K-1 Scandinavia Rumble of the Kings 2010 || Stockholm, Sweden || Decision || 3 || 3:00

|-  bgcolor="#CCFFCC"
| 2010-06-12 || Win ||align=left| Faldir Chahbari || Beast of the East 2010 Poland || Gdynia, Poland || Ext. R Decision (Unanimous) || 4 || 3:00

|-  bgcolor="#CCFFCC"
| 2009-11-20 || Win ||align=left| Gago Drago || K-1 Rumble of the Kings 2009 in Stockholm || Stockholm, Sweden || Decision (Unanimous) || 3 || 3:00
|-  bgcolor="#CCFFCC"
| 2009-02-27 || Win ||align=left| Dzhabar Askerov || K-1 Scandinavia 2009 Norrköping || Norrköping, Sweden || Ext R. (Decision) || 4 || 3:00

|-  bgcolor="#CCFFCC"
| 2008-05-31 || Win ||align=left| Dzhabar Askerov || K-1 Scandinavia MAX 2008, Final || Stockholm, Sweden ||  TKO (Referee stop/cut) || 3 || 0:43
|-  bgcolor="#CCFFCC"
| 2008-05-31 || Win ||align=left| Joakim Karlsson|| K-1 Scandinavia MAX 2008, Semi Final  || Stockholm, Sweden ||  Ext. R Decision (Unanimous) || 4 || 3:00
|-  bgcolor="#CCFFCC"
| 2008-05-31 || Win ||align=left| Mattias Karlsson || K-1 Scandinavia MAX 2008, Quarter Final || Stockholm, Sweden ||  Ext. R Decision (Unanimous) || 4 || 3:00

|-  bgcolor="#CCFFCC"
| 2007-09-15 || Win ||align=left| Hesdy van Assen || King of the Ring || Malmö, Sweden || Decision (Majority)  || 5 || 3:00
|-  bgcolor="#FFBBBB"
| 2007-05-20 || Loss ||align=left| Harvey Harra || K-1 UK MAX Tournament 2007 Pain & Glory || London, England ||  Decision (Unanimous) || 3 || 3:00
|-  bgcolor="#CCFFCC"
| 2007-04-28 || Win ||align=left| Piotr Woznicki || Fightnight || Höör, Sweden || KO || 1 || 
|-  bgcolor="#CCFFCC" 
| 2006-12-16 || Win ||align=left| Hannu Vappula || Travelfight || Uppsala, Sweden || Decision (Unanimous) || 5 || 3:00
|-  bgcolor="#CCFFCC"
| 2006-09-30 || Win ||align=left| William Schafferer || Champions Fight Night 2 || Halmstad, Sweden || Decision || 3 || 3:00
|-
! style=background:white colspan=9 |
|-
|-  bgcolor="#CCFFCC"
| 2006-09-30 || Win ||align=left| Josef Fjällgren || Champions Fight Night 2 || Halmstad, Sweden ||  || || 

|-  bgcolor="#CCFFCC"
| 2005-08-27 || Win ||align=left| Bassam Chahrour || || Kalundborg, Denmark || Decision (Unanimous) || 5 || 3:00
|-
| colspan=9 | Legend:    

|-  bgcolor="#FFBBBB"
| 2010-09-02 || Loss ||align=left| Chalermdet Infinity || SportAccord Combat Games, Final -71 kg || Beijing, China || Decision (3-2) || 4 || 2:00
|-
! style=background:white colspan=9 |
|-
|-  bgcolor="#CCFFCC"
| 2010-08-31 || Win ||align=left| Zhang Xias Long || SportAccord Combat Games, Semi Finals -71 kg || Beijing, China || Decision (3-2) || 4 || 2:00
|-  bgcolor="#CCFFCC"
| 2010-08-29 || Win ||align=left| Bakhulule Baai || SportAccord Combat Games, Quarter Finals -71 kg || Beijing, China || Decision (5-0) || 4 || 2:00

|-  bgcolor="#FFBBBB"
| 2009-11-29 || Loss ||align=left| Vitaly Gurkov || IFMA 2009 World Muaythai Championships, Quarter Finals -71 kg || Bangkok, Thailand || Decision || 4 || 2:00
|-  bgcolor="#FFBBBB"
| 2008-09-30 || Loss ||align=left| Petr Nakonechnyi || 4th Busan TAFISA World Games || Busan, Korea ||  Decision (Unanimous) || 4 || 2:00
|-  bgcolor="#CCFFCC"
| 2008-09-29 || Win ||align=left| Tomi Karttunen || 4th Busan TAFISA World Games || Busan, Korea ||  Decision (Unanimous) || 4 || 2:00
|-  bgcolor="#CCFFCC"
| 2008-09-29 || Win ||align=left| Daniel van || 4th Busan TAFISA World Games || Busan, Korea ||  Decision (Unanimous) || 4 || 2:00

|-  bgcolor="#CCFFCC"
| 2008-04-23 || Win ||align=left| Nima Rafiei || SM Thaiboxing 2008 Finals || Stockholm, Sweden ||  Decision (Split) || 5 || 3:00
|-
! style=background:white colspan=9 |
|-
|-  bgcolor="#CCFFCC"
| 2008-04-19 || Win ||align=left| Dan Jentzen || SM Thaiboxing 2008 quarter finals || Stockholm, Sweden ||  TKO (Corner stoppage) || 1 ||
|-  bgcolor="#FFBBBB"
| 2007-12-03 || Loss ||align=left| Samaan Yaba || IFMA World Championships || Bangkok, Thailand ||  Decision (Unanimous) || 4 || 2:00
|-  bgcolor="#CCFFCC"
| 2007-12-01 || Win ||align=left| Gafary Boussary || IFMA World Championships || Bangkok, Thailand ||  Decision (Unanimous) || 4 || 2:00
|-  bgcolor="#CCFFCC"
| 2007-11-29 || Win ||align=left| Denis Dikusar || IFMA World Championships || Bangkok, Thailand ||  Decision (Unanimous) || 4 || 2:00

|-  bgcolor="#CCFFCC"
| 2006-02-19 || Win ||align=left| Josef Fjällgren || Swedish Muaythai championships || Stockholm, Sweden || Decision (Unanimous) || 5 || 3:00
|-
! style=background:white colspan=9 |
|-
|-  bgcolor="#CCFFCC"
| 2006-02-17 || Win ||align=left| Kim Hansson || Swedish Muaythai championships || Stockholm, Sweden || Decision (Split)  || 5 || 3:00
|-
| colspan=9 | Legend:

See also 
 List of K-1 champions
 List of male kickboxers

References

1982 births
Living people
Swedish male kickboxers
Middleweight kickboxers
Swedish Muay Thai practitioners
Sportspeople from Malmö